Waiting for Anya is a 2020 historical war drama film co-written and directed by Ben Cookson. It is a film adaptation of the 1990 novel of the same name by Michael Morpurgo.

The film stars Noah Schnapp, Thomas Kretschmann, Frederick Schmidt, Jean Reno, and Anjelica Huston. The film premiered at the 2020 Miami Jewish Film Festival and was released on 7 February 2020.

Plot
The film begins in the summer of 1942, during World War II in the German occupation of France, a small village in the Pyrenees. A Jewish father named Benjamin walks his daughter, Anya, to the safety of a train fleeing France. One day, a young shepherd named Jo discovers several Jewish children hidden on a farm run by a widow, Horcada, and her son-in-law, the aforementioned Benjamin. Benjamin has lost track of Anya, but hopes to one day find her. During this time, helped by his mother-in-law, he helps the young Jews whom they protect to flee to Spain through the mountains. But this time, their mission is disrupted by the Germans who skirt the border, making it impossible to escape. Listening only to his courage, Jo decides to keep their secret and do everything to help them escape to Spain.

Supported by his grandfather, several inhabitants of the village and his father, a former prisoner of the Germans, Jo allies with Benjamin and the widow Horcada to allow the children to escape across the border. Although many children manage to escape to Spain one child becomes very sick and Benjamin takes her to the village where they are taken by the Germans. It transpires that one friendly German officer (who lost his own daughter in a Berlin bombing) was aware of the children hiding but kept quiet about it, later telling Jo “at least we achieved something”.

One year after the war ends Anya eventually reaches the village and is welcomed by her grandmother and Jo.

Cast

Release
The film premiered at the Miami Jewish Film Festival on 16 January 2020, and was theatrically released in the United States on 7 February 2020 by Vertical Entertainment and in the United Kingdom on 21 February 2020.

Reception

Box office
Waiting for Anya grossed $0 in the United States and Canada, and a worldwide total of $139,504.

Critical response
On Metacritic, the film holds a rating of 38 out of 100, based on 5 critics, indicating "generally unfavorable reviews".

References

External links
 
 
 

2020 films
2020 drama films
2020 war drama films
2020s historical drama films
2020s English-language films
English-language Belgian films
British war drama films
Belgian war drama films
Films about the French Resistance
Holocaust films
Films based on British novels
Films set in France
Vertical Entertainment films
2020s British films
Belgian World War II films
British World War II films